Outside the Dog Museum is a novel by the American writer Jonathan Carroll, published in 1991. It tells the story of Harry Radcliffe, a successful architect commissioned to design a Dog Museum for the wealthy Sultan of Saru. In the process, he finds a magical new world.

References

Novels by Jonathan Carroll
1991 novels
American fantasy novels
Doubleday (publisher) books
Novels about architects
Novels about museums